USS Alacrity (AM-520/MSO-520) was an Ability-class minesweeper acquired by the United States Navy for the task of removing mines that had been placed in the water to prevent the safe passage of ships.

The third ship to be named Alacrity by the Navy, MSO-520 was laid down on 5 March 1956 at Sturgeon Bay, Wisconsin, by the Peterson Builders; launched on 8 June 1957; sponsored by Mrs. Henry J. Armstrong, the wife of Capt. Armstrong, the chief of staff and aide to the Commandant of the 9th Naval District; ferried to Boston, Massachusetts, via the Great Lakes and the St. Lawrence River; fitted out at the Boston Naval Shipyard; and commissioned there on 1 October 1958, Lt. Theodore W. Pstrak in command.

East Coast operations
 
The following month, Alacrity moved south to Charleston, South Carolina, whence she conducted shakedown training before becoming a unit of the Atlantic Fleet Mine Force. The minesweeper began operations in the western Atlantic and in the West Indies. Those duties occupied her time until late in 1960 when she embarked upon her first deployment to the Mediterranean Sea. After her return from duty with the U.S. 6th Fleet late in the spring of 1961, she resumed normal operations along the U.S. East Coast and in the West Indies. That employment lasted until February 1964 at which time Alacrity headed back to the Mediterranean. Her arrival back on the east coast late in the summer of 1964 brought more duty in the western Atlantic. In February 1965, the minesweeper began a four-month tour of duty in the West Indies.

Dominican Republic emergency operations
 
Near the end of that assignment, in late April 1965, civil war erupted in the Dominican Republic, as supporters of exiled President Juan Bosch instituted a military uprising to seize power from the ruling civilian junta. The resultant strife—the city of Santo Domingo became a battleground—saw the commitment of American marines and paratroopers; Alacrity spent almost the entire month of May helping to evacuate foreign nationals and supporting the troops of an inter-American force sent to restore order.

Caribbean and Mediterranean operations
 
While operating in the western Atlantic and the West Indies, Alacrity frequently conducted tests for the Naval Ordnance Laboratory Test Facility located at Fort Lauderdale, Florida, and served as a training platform for students at the Mine Warfare School. Those duties, as well as refresher training and independent ship's exercises, occupied her from the beginning of 1966 into the spring of 1969. On 8 May 1969, Alacrity put to sea, once more bound for the Mediterranean. After five months with the U.S. 6th Fleet engaged in training exercises and port visits, the minesweeper headed back to the United States on 11 October. She reached Charleston on 30 October. Then, except for 12 days underway for special operations at the beginning of December, the warship spent the remainder of the year in port at Charleston

Renewed Mediterranean operations
 
In 1970, Alacrity conducted exercises out of her home port until mid-June. On the 17th of that month, she entered Avondale Shipyards, Inc., for a regular overhaul. The minesweeper completed repairs and left New Orleans, Louisiana, on 1 December. She returned to Charleston on the 6th and, after holiday leave and upkeep, resumed normal operations. After seven months of exercises, drills, and inspections out of Charleston, Alacrity headed back toward the Mediterranean on 2 August. She entered the "Middle Sea" late in August and spent September and the first week in October steaming in the western Mediterranean and making port visits. Alacrity returned to Rota, Spain, on 7 October and two days later sailed for the United States. She returned to Charleston on 27 October and, except for a week at sea for special operations in the middle of December, spent the remainder of the year in her home port.

Supporting Apollo Project missions
 
On 10 January 1972, Alacrity departed Charleston for an eight-day, cold weather, amphibious exercise off the shores of Maine. By the end of January, the minesweeper was back in Charleston and, in February, resumed normal operations. In April, she interrupted her schedule to provide support for the Apollo 16 moon shot. She resumed operations out of Charleston late in April and remained so occupied almost until the end of the year. Early in December, she returned to the vicinity of Port Canaveral, Florida, to assist in gathering data during the Apollo 17 moon shot. Alacrity concluded that duty at Charleston on 8 December and remained in port for the rest of 1972.

Converted into a Miscellaneous Auxiliary
 
The warship spent the first four months of 1973 working out of Charleston. On 10 May, she entered Detyen's Shipyard in Mount Pleasant, South Carolina, for modifications. On 1 June 1973, Alacrity was redesignated AG-520. She left Detyen's Shipyard on 23 July and returned to the Naval Station, Charleston, where she remained until 5 August. On that day, the ship headed south to Jacksonville, Florida, where she began further alterations at the Atlantic Drydock Co. on 7 August. The changes were completed by 19 October, and Alacrity returned to Charleston to prepare for refresher training. During November and early December, she conducted refresher training in the West Indies before returning to Charleston on the 10th to begin the annual holiday leave and upkeep period.

Alacrity’s final Med cruise
 
Alacrity began 1974 engaged in normal operations which kept her busy until midsummer. On 16 July, she stood out of Charleston and embarked upon the final Mediterranean deployment of her active career. The minesweeper operated with the U.S. 6th Fleet conducting training evolutions and port visits until the end of November. She departed Rota, Spain, on 30 November and arrived back in Charleston on 20 December. The ship continued in active service for another 33 months. Throughout that period, she operated in the western Atlantic and in the West Indies on training missions and test-and-evaluation assignments.

Decommissioning
On 30 September 1977, Alacrity was placed out of commission at Charleston, and her name was struck from the Navy list that same day. In December 1979, she was sold to the Ampol Corp. for scrapping.

References

External links
 USS Alacrity
 NavSource Online: Mine Warfare Vessel Photo Archive – MSO / AG-520 Alacrity

 

Ability-class minesweepers
Vietnam War mine warfare vessels of the United States
1957 ships